The Armenian national rugby union team began playing in the European Nations Cup in 2004. However, Rugby Europe suspended the Rugby Federation of Armenia in November 2014 due to inactivity.

The team had been unexpectedly strong due to the large Armenian diaspora in France (as well as other traditionally strong rugby nations). So the team has drawn many players, coaches, and trainers from this experienced pool. The team was undefeated since debuting in European competition in 2004 until 1 October 2006, when they lost to Switzerland 16–29 in Vienne (France). The coach is Laurent Hairabetian. Prior to that loss they had won ten tests in a row progressing up the FIRA-AER divisions until reaching Division 3A in the European Nations Cup tournament.

Record

Overall

Undefeated streak (2004–2006) 
 2 June 2004 : Armenia 36 – 6 Norway (Div. 3C)
 5 June 2004 : Armenia  48 – 0 Israel (Div. 3C)
 20 October 2004 : Armenia 24 – 11 Belgium (friendly match)
 7 April 2005 : Armenia  47 – 15 Israel (Div. 3)
 11 June 2005 : Armenia 31 – 12 Israel (Div. 3)
 1 October 2005 : Armenia 39 – 12 Luxembourg (Div. 3B/C Playoff)
 12 November 2005 : Armenia 57 – 17 Bulgaria (Div. 3B)
 29 April 2006 : Armenia 24 – 13 Hungary (Div. 3B)
 13 May 2006 : Armenia  42 – 6 Slovenia (Div. 3B)
 4 June 2006 : Armenia 18 – 3 Lithuania (Div. 3B)

2006–2008 European Nations Cup 

FIRA-AER, ENC Division 3A standings

See also 
Rugby union in Armenia
Sports in Armenia

External links
An article on the Armenian national rugby team
Armenia on IRB.com
Pictures of the Team in Armenia

References

European national rugby union teams
Rugby union in Armenia
Teams in European Nations Cup (rugby union)